Vía Argentina is a Panama Metro station on Line 1. It was one of the metro network's first 11 stations, opened on 5 April 2014 and commencing operations the following day. 

The station serves the neighbourhoods of Obarrio and El Cangrejo, providing access to the city's financial and banking district. 

In its first year of operations, it was the sixth most used station of the twelve on the network at that time, carrying 18% of the system's users at peak times.

References

Panama Metro stations
2014 establishments in Panama
Railway stations opened in 2014